Brant Garvey (born 9 January 1985) is an Australian leg amputee paratriathlete. He represented Australia at the 2016 Rio Paralympics when paratriathlon made its debut at the Paralympics.

Personal
Garvey was born on 9 January 1985 in Darwin, Northern Territory. He is a congenital above the knee amputee. His sister was diagnosed with three types of cancer at the age of fourteen and this has inspired Garvey to accept sporting challenges. He lives in Perth, Western Australia. He is the founder of noXcuses, an Australian apparel company for triathletes and fitness enthusiasts. Garvey is married to Natalie.

Career
Prior to taking up paratriathlon, Garvey was a successful swimmer and wheelchair basketballer. He competed in wheelchair basketball for Australia at the 2002 FESPIC Games held in Korea. He was a member of the Perth Wheelcats that won five Australian Wheelchair Basketball Championships  and has played professional wheelchair basketball in Spain for two years. He has completed Rottnest Channel Swim five times.

At the age of twenty-eight, he decided to try and run for the first time using a prosthetic leg and his first event was the HBF Run for a Reason over 12 km. In 2013, he completed an ironman triathlon consisting of a 3.8 km swim, a 180 km bike ride and a 42.2 km marathon run. He finished in a time of 11:49:20 and became the first Australian above-knee amputee to complete an ironman triathlon.

Garvey is classified as a PT2 paratriathlete. Garvey's first major international event was the 2013 ITU Grand Final in London where he finished sixth. In 2016, he qualified Australia a quota place in the 2016 Rio Paralympics by finishing second at International Triathlon Union event on the Gold Coast, Queensland. In May, 2016, he finished second in the Yokohama ITU World Paratriathlon PT2 Event. In 2016, he is a Western Australian Institute of Sport scholarship holder and coached by Ross Pedlow.

In 2016, he was awarded the Western Australian Institute of Sport Personal Excellence Award for his efforts in setting up and flourishing personal branding business, titled noXcuses.

World Triathlon Grand Final (Championships) Results
 2013 London - 6th TRI-2
 2014 Edmonton - 6th PT2
 2015 Chicago - 6th PT2
 2017 Rotterdam - 8th TS2

Oceania Championships
 2014 Sydney - 1st PT2
 2015 Sydney - 1st PT2
 2016 Devonport - 1st PT2

Paralympics
 2016 Rio - 10th PT2

In 2016, Garvey competed in the 2016 Rio Paralympic Games and placed 10th in the Men's PT2 event. Reflecting on his performance, Garvey states "I was in excruciating pain, dropped a few swear words, lucky they (the Brazilian fans) don't speak English as a first language. I didn't think I was going to be able to run but managed to get into a bit of a rhythm and finished my first Paralympic Games."

References

External links
 
 
 
 
 

1985 births
Living people
Paratriathletes of Australia
Paratriathletes at the 2016 Summer Paralympics
Australian male triathletes
Sportspeople from Perth, Western Australia
Amputee category Paralympic competitors
Australian amputees
FESPIC Games competitors
20th-century Australian people
21st-century Australian people